The City of Sheffield is a city and metropolitan borough in South Yorkshire, England. The metropolitan borough includes the administrative centre of Sheffield, the town of Stocksbridge and larger village of Chapeltown and part of the Peak District. It has a population of 584,853 (mid-2019 est), making it technically the third largest city in England by population behind Birmingham and Leeds, since London is not considered a single entity. It is governed by Sheffield City Council.

The current city boundaries were set on 1 April 1974 by the provisions of the Local Government Act 1972, as part a reform of local government in England. The city is a merger of two former local government districts; the unitary City and County Borough of Sheffield combined with the urban district of Stocksbridge and parts of the rural district of Wortley from the West Riding of Yorkshire.

For its first 12 years the city had a two-tier system of local government; Sheffield City Council shared power with South Yorkshire County Council. Since the Local Government Act 1985 Sheffield City Council has effectively been a unitary authority, serving as the sole executive, deliberative and legislative body responsible for local policy, setting council tax, and allocating budget in the city, and is a member of the Sheffield City Region Partnership. The City of Sheffield is divided into three civil parishes and a single unparished area.

Geography

The present city boundaries were set in 1974 (with slight modification in 1994), when the former county borough of Sheffield merged with Stocksbridge Urban District and two parishes from the Wortley Rural District. This area includes a significant part of the countryside surrounding the main urban region. Roughly a third of Sheffield lies in the Peak District National Park. No other English city had parts of a national park within its boundary, until the creation in March 2010 of the South Downs National Park, part of which lies within Brighton and Hove.

Governance
Sheffield City Council is the local authority of the district. The council is composed of 84 councillors, three for each of the city's 28 wards. It is currently under No Overall Control. The City was under Labour control from its creation until 1999, when the Liberal Democrats took control of the council. The Labour Party regained control of the Council in 2002 with power shifting back to the Liberal Democrats in 2008. However, Labour took control once again in 2011. Following the 2021 elections the Council is now in No Overall Control.  As a metropolitan county, South Yorkshire does not have a county council, so Sheffield City Council is the primary provider of local government services. The district forms part of the Yorkshire and the Humber region of England.

Most of the district is an unparished area, comprising Sheffield itself (the area of the former county borough). In the unparished area there is no lower tier of government. Outside the unparished area there are 3 civil parishes, represented by parish councils. These form the lowest tier of local government. The 3 civil parishes are:

The district is represented by five MPs, for the constituencies of Sheffield Brightside and Hillsborough, Sheffield Central, Sheffield Hallam, Sheffield Heeley, Sheffield South East all currently represented by Labour. The consistuency of Penistone and Stocksbridge is partially in the City of Sheffield and is represented by the Conservatives.

Demography

The latest population estimate for the City of Sheffield is  residents.

Transport

Parts of the city are covered by the Sheffield Supertram light rail tram network.

Notes and references
References

Bibliography
 
 

 
Cities in Yorkshire and the Humber
Local government districts in South Yorkshire
Metropolitan boroughs